Slovene months have standard modern names derived from Latin names, as in most European languages. There are also archaic Slovene month names, mostly of Slavic origin, which exist in both a standardized set as well as many variations.

Standard modern names

The standard modern Slovene month names are januar, februar, marec, april, maj, junij, julij, avgust, september, oktober, november, and december. When writing dates, they appear after the day and are often represented by Arabic numerals, and sometimes with Roman numerals (e.g., 19. 5. or 19. V. 'May 19th'). Older variants include januvarij 'January', februvarij 'February', and marcij 'March'.

Standard archaic names

Many of the names in the standardized set of archaic Slovene month names first occur in the Škofja Loka manuscript, written in 1466 by Martin of Loka.

 January  '(sun) shining through'; modern Slovene 
 February  perhaps 'dry' or 'cut' (influenced by svečnica 'Candlemas'); modern Slovene 
 March  '(earth) dry (enough for cultivation)'; modern Slovene 
 April  'small grass'; modern Slovene 
 May  'large grass'; modern Slovene 
 June  'flowers' (a translation of German Rosenmonat); modern Slovene 
 July  'small sickle' (i.e., reaping); modern Slovene 
 August  'large sickle' (i.e., reaping); modern Slovene 
 September  'nodding (fruit)'; modern Slovene 
 October  'wine flowing' (a translation of German Weinmonat); modern Slovene 
 November  'falling leaves'; modern Slovene 
 December  'biting (cold)' or 'clumped (earth)'; modern Slovene

Variant archaic month names
Multiple systems have been used in various Slovene-speaking regions, some of which were based on the names of saints (e.g., jurjevščak 'April', literally 'St. George's'), numbers (e.g., prvnik 'January', literally 'first'), or other features (e.g., vetrnik 'March', literally 'windy'). In the Prekmurje dialect of Slovene, the following system was attested: sečen 'January', süšec 'February', mali traven 'March', velki traven 'April', risalšček 'May', ivanšček 'June', jakopešček 'July', mešnjek 'August', mihalšček 'September', vsesvišček 'October', andrejšček 'November', božič 'December'.

By month
January
Additional names include brumen (< Italian bruma 'depth of winter'), sečen (related to suh 'dry' or from sek- 'cut'), ledenec and lednik (< led 'ice'), mali božičnjak and malobožičnjak (< mali božič 'Epiphany'), prozimec (probably contamination of prosinec with zima 'winter'), prvnik (< prvi 'first'), and zimec (< zima 'winter'). The name prosinec, associated with millet bread and the act of asking for something, was first written in the Škofja Loka manuscript.
February
Additional names include sečan and sečen (both related to suh 'dry' or from sek- 'cut'), and sečni mesec (< sek- 'cut'). The name svečan may relate to icicles or Candlemas. This name originates from sičan, written as svičan in the New Carniolan Almanac from 1775 and changed to its final form by Franc Metelko in his New Almanac from 1824. The name was also spelled sečan, meaning "the month of cutting down of trees". In 1848, a proposal was put forward in Kmetijske in rokodelske novice by the Slovene Society of Ljubljana to call this month talnik (related to ice melting), but it has not stuck. The idea was proposed by the priest and patriot Blaž Potočnik. A name of February in Slovene was also vesnar, after the mythological character Vesna.
March
Additional names include brezen and breznik (both from breza 'birch'), ebehtnik (< Middle High German ebennaht 'equinox'), gregorščak (< Gregor '(Saint) Gregory'), marcij, postnik (< post 'Lent'), traven (< trava 'grass'), and tretnik (< tretji 'third'). The name sušec was first written in the Škofja Loka manuscript.
April
Additional names include brezen (< breza 'birch') and jurijevščak (< Jurij '(Saint) George'). The name mali traven was first written in the Škofja Loka manuscript.
May
Additional names include cvetičnik and cvetnar (both < cvet 'flower'), majnik, mlečen (< mleč 'chicory'), risalščak and rusalščak (< risale/rusale 'Pentecost'), rožni mesec (< roža 'flower'), and sviben (< sviba '(flowering of) dogwood'). The name veliki traven was first written in the Škofja Loka manuscript.
June
Additional names include bobov cvet (literally, 'broad bean blossom') ivanjščak and šentjanževec (both referring to Saint John's Day), klasen (< klas 'head of grain'), kresnik (< kres 'bonfire', referring to Midsummer), prašnik (literally, 'stamen'), rožencvet and rožni cvet (both 'flower blossom'), and rženi cvet ('rye blossom').
July
Additional names include jakobnik and jakobščak (both referring to Saint James's Day), pšeničnik (< pšenica 'wheat'), and žetnik (< žetev 'reaping').
August
Additional names include kolovožnjak, medmašnik, mešnjak, otavnik, porcijunkula, velikomašnjak, and vršenj.
September
Additional names include jesenik, jesenščak, kozoprsk, miholščak, poberuh, and šmihelščnik.
October
Additional names include kozoprsk, listopad, lukovščak, moštnik, obročnik, repar, repnik, vinec, and vinščak.
November
Additional names include andrejščak, gnilolist, listognoj, martinščak, vsesvečnjak, and vsesvečak.
December
Additional names include kolednjak and veliki božičnjak (< božič 'Christmas').

See also
Croatian months
Czech months   
Macedonian months
Slavic calendar

References

External links
http://projetbabel.org/forum/viewtopic.php?t=7222 A comprehensive table of Slavic and Baltic month names, explanation in French.

Slovene language
Months